Perfluoro(2-methyl-3-pentanone) is a fluorinated ketone with the structural formula CF3CF2C(=O)CF(CF3)2, a fully-fluorinated analog of ethyl isopropyl ketone. It it used as an electronics coolant liquid and fire protection fluid sold commercially by 3M under brand names such as Novec 1230, Novec 649, and FK-5-1-12. It is also known as “waterless water” or “dry water”.

Applications
3M produces perfluoro(2-methyl-3-pentanone) under different brand names of Novec 1230 and Novec 649. These two products have different purity grades (>99% and >99.9%, respectively) intended for different industrial applications.

Novec 1230 and FK-5-1-12
Novec 1230 is used as gaseous fire suppression agent in scenarios where water-based fire suppression (for example, from a fire sprinkler) would be impractical or where it could damage expensive equipment or property, such as museums, server rooms, banks, clean rooms and hospitals. It functions by rapidly removing heat to extinguish a fire before it starts; also, its density enables it to displace air and thereby deprive the fire of oxygen. Novec 1230 can be used in both total/partial/localized flooding systems, and directional spray-type applications; it is also used in portable extinguishers for specialized applications. The Patent for Novec 1230 as fire extinguishant ended on July 19, 2020. Since the expiry of the patent, multiple companies have brought equivalent products to market under the chemical name FK-5-1-12. 

Recently, it has found active use in microencapsulated form in the manufacture of fire-extinguishing composite materials. Samsung SDI is using this product to extinguish fires in the early stages of modular high-capacity storage systems (ESS) based on lithium-ion batteries for solar panels and electric vehicles. In August 2019, Samsung SDI officially announced its investment of $ 169 million into fire-extinguishing composite materials based on microencapsulated Novec 1230. The firm later reported that UL9540A testing for this product was passed.

Novec 649
Novec 649 is a low temperature heat transfer fluid. It has been used as a full-immersion fluid in a proof of concept data center cooling system by Intel and SGI. As it boils off easily due to its  boiling point, it is used in two-phase immersion cooling system with a condensing loop running cold water. Effects of evaporative cooling was utilized to remove additional heat.

Traditional Perfluorocarbons (PFCs) based compounds for cooling such as Fluorinert has extremely high Global Warming Potential (GWP) of over 9,000. Novec 649 was chosen instead as good drop-in replacement due to having similar thermo-physical properties to Fluorinert FC-72 (perfluorohexane, C6F14) while having very low global warming potential (GWP) of 1.

Environmental safety
Novec 649/1230 does not deplete ozone (ODP 0) and has a global warming potential of 1 (over 100 years), equivalent to that of carbon dioxide. The Globally Harmonized System of Classification and Labeling of Chemicals (GHS) classifies this chemical as H412 - Harmful to aquatic life with long lasting effects. Photolysis in sunlight, hydrolysis and hydration may be a significant sink of Novec 649/1230 in the environment. It has very short estimated atmospheric lifetime of around 4 to 15 days.

Novec 649/1230 is classified as a PFAS substance. In December 2022, 3M announced that it would cease production of all PFAS products by 2025, including Novec 649/1230. It degrades to Trifluoroacetic acid (TFA) via photolytic degradation in sunlight. Novec and TFA do not bioaccumulate, however TFA is a persistent organic pollutant.

See also 

Fire protection fluid
Immersion cooling
Liquid dielectric
Hydrofluoroether
Fluorinert

References

External links 

3M Novec 1230 Website
3M Novec 649 product page
Technical Brief, Environmental properties of Novec 1230 Fluid
Data Sheets of Novec 649 Fluid
MSDS for Novec 1230
Patent for Novec 1230
United States Environmental Protection Agency Substitutes in Total Flooding Agents
3M Novec 649 as a replacement of C6F14 in liquid cooling systems

Coolants
Fire suppression agents
Ketones
Liquid dielectrics
Organofluorides
Perfluorinated compounds
3M brands
Greenhouse gases